James E. McWilliams (born 28 November 1968) is professor of history at Texas State University. He specializes in American history, of the colonial and early national period, and in the  environmental history of the United States. He also writes for The Texas Observer and the History News Service, and has published a number of op-eds on food in The New York Times, The Christian Science Monitor, and USA Today. Some of his most popular articles advocate veganism.

Career
He received his B.A. in philosophy from Georgetown University in 1991, his Ed.M. from Harvard University in 1994, his M.A. in American studies from the University of Texas at Austin in 1996, and his Ph.D. in history from Johns Hopkins University in 2001. He won the Walter Muir Whitehill Prize in Early American History awarded by the Colonial Society of Massachusetts for 2000, and won the Hiett Prize in the Humanities from the Dallas Institute of Humanities and Culture in 2009. He has been a fellow in the Agrarian Studies Program at Yale University.

McWilliams married Leila C. Kempner on March 18, 1995.  James and Leila and their two children live in Austin, Texas.

McWilliams is an avid runner and a vegan.

Animal rights

In 2015, McWilliams authored The Modern Savage: Our Unthinking Decision to Eat Animals, a book supportive of animal rights and veganism. McWilliams criticizes the locavore movement, such as backyard and nonindustrial farms which preach compassionate care of animals but slaughter them in the end.

Reception

McWilliams' book A Revolution in Eating was positively reviewed by anthropologist Jeffrey Cole as an "engaging, creative, and informative account of food
in colonial British America." Historian Etta Madden also positively reviewed the book, commenting that "McWilliams's study of the production and consumption of food contributes to a great understanding
of the relationship between food and American identity."

Biologist Marc Bekoff positively reviewed The Modern Savage, as a "very thoughtful work about our meal plans in which he covers the ecological and ethical reasons for not eating nonhuman animals (animals)." Kirkus Reviews commented, "While McWilliams offers convincing arguments for animal rights, they are undermined by the extensive quotes, which become tiresome and offer little useful context." McWilliams' views on agriculture, food production, and animal husbandry have been criticized by other authors in the space, including Joel Salatin. In her review in the Chicago Tribune, journalist Monica Eng, questions McWilliams' "contrarian essays" that "play well in the land of page views, [but] don't always fare so well in terms of accuracy."

Publications

Books

 (held in 754 worldCat libraries)
Review: "American Pests": Our wrongheaded approach to insect control: Bugged to death: James E. McWilliams takes on insects, agriculture and pesticides in "American Pests: The Losing War on Insects from Colonial Times to DDT." By Irene Wanner, The Seattle Times,  August 8, 2008 

(held in 868 worldCat libraries)

Peer-reviewed articles
“The horizon opened up very greatly.: Leland O. Howard and the Transition to Chemical Insecticides in the United States, 1894–1927” Agricultural History (Fall 2008).
 “Cuisine and National Identity in the Early Republic,” Historically Speaking (May/June 2006), 5–8.
”African Americans, Native Americans, and the Origins of American Food,” The Texas Journal of History and Genealogy. Volume 4 (2005), pp. 12–16.
 " 'how unripe we are': An Intellectual Construction of American Food,” Food, Society, and Culture (Fall 2005), pp. 143–160.
“‘To Forward Well-Flavored Productions’: The Kitchen Garden in Early New England.” The New England Quarterly (March 2004), p. 25-50.
“Integrating Primary and Secondary Sources,” Teaching History (Spring 2004), pp. 3–14.
“The Transition from Capitalism and the Consolidation of Authority in the Chesapeake Bay Region, 1607–1760: An Interpretive Model,” Maryland Historical Magazine (Summer 2002), pp. 135–152. 
“New England’s First Depression: An Export-Led Interpretation,” The Journal of Interdisciplinary History (Summer 2002), pp. 1–20 .
“Work, Family, and Economic Improvement in Seventeenth-Century Massachusetts Bay,” The New England Quarterly (September 2001), pp. 355–384. (Winner of the 2000 Whitehill Prize in Colonial History  for the best essay published that year in colonial history).  
“Brewing Beer in Massachusetts Bay, 1640–1690.” The New England Quarterly (December 1998), pp. 353–384.

Popular articles

 

 (105 Readers' Comments)

List of McWilliams' articles in The Atlantic
List of McWilliams' articles in The New York Times

See also 
List of vegans
Food studies
Veganism
Animal protectionism

References

External links

McWilliams' official faculty page at Texas State
McWilliams' Curriculum Vitae
McWilliams' blog
Walter Muir Whitehill Prize in Early American History
History News Service

1968 births
21st-century American historians
21st-century American male writers
American animal rights scholars
American food writers
American male non-fiction writers
American non-fiction environmental writers
American veganism activists
Food historians
Georgetown University alumni
Harvard Graduate School of Education alumni
Johns Hopkins University alumni
Living people
Texas State University faculty
University of Texas at Austin College of Liberal Arts alumni